Raphaël Hector Perrissoud (23 December 1879 – 26 April 1956) was a French fencer. He competed in the men's foil event at the 1900 Summer Olympics.

References

External links
 

1879 births
1956 deaths
French male foil fencers
Olympic fencers of France
Fencers at the 1900 Summer Olympics
Fencers from Paris